Roudolphe Douala M'bela (born 25 September 1978), known as Douala, is a Cameroonian former professional footballer.

Mainly a winger he could also operate as a forward, and played professionally in five countries, mainly in Portugal. He amassed Primeira Liga totals of 213 games and 34 goals over the course of nine seasons, notably representing in the competition Sporting (three years), Boavista and União de Leiria (two apiece).

Douala appeared for the Cameroon national team at the 2006 Africa Cup of Nations.

Club career
Douala was born in Douala. He started his professional career at AS Saint-Étienne but did not make any Ligue 2 appearances for the French club, moving to Portugal when he was 20 and signing with Boavista FC.

After two loans, at Gil Vicente F.C. and U.D. Leiria (where he first made an impact in the Primeira Liga championship), Douala moved to Sporting Clube de Portugal, scoring five league goals in his debut season while also helping the Lions to the campaign's UEFA Cup final, notably scoring against Middlesbrough in a 3–2 away win. Never an undisputed starter, however, he would be loaned for 2006–07 to England's Portsmouth on the very last day of the summer transfer window, with a view to a permanent signing.

Speculation during the 2007 winter window had linked Douala with a move away from the club, with the player reportedly frustrated at his lack of first team opportunities at Fratton Park. A transfer never materialized, however, and he revealed that "On the last day of the transfer window two clubs were calling me all day, but I said 'I want to stay'".

Douala returned to Sporting when his loan ended and, on 14 July 2007, rejoined old club Saint-Étienne for an undisclosed fee. After only one season where he appeared sparingly, he left for Asteras Tripoli F.C. in Greece. A fruitless spell soon followed and, after agreeing a release from his contract, he signed with English club Plymouth Argyle on 22 March 2009, for the remainder of the 2008–09 campaign, making his debut as a substitute in their 4–0 home win against Coventry City on 11 April; however, he was unsuccessful in securing a long-term deal, and was released.

On 15 March 2010, 31-year-old Douala moved teams and countries again, signing with Belgium's Lierse SK, and the club returned to the Pro League at the season's end, with the player contributing with one goal.

International career
Douala earned 17 caps for Cameroon, during five years. He participated at the 2006 Africa Cup of Nations, helping the national team reach the quarter-final stage.

International goals

Honours

Club
Sporting
UEFA Cup: Runner-up 2004–05

Individual
Primeira Liga: Player of the Month March 2004

References

External links

Biography at Anciens Verts 

1978 births
Living people
Footballers from Douala
Cameroonian footballers
Association football wingers
Ligue 1 players
AS Saint-Étienne players
Primeira Liga players
Boavista F.C. players
C.D. Aves players
Gil Vicente F.C. players
U.D. Leiria players
Sporting CP footballers
Premier League players
English Football League players
Portsmouth F.C. players
Plymouth Argyle F.C. players
Super League Greece players
Asteras Tripolis F.C. players
Belgian Pro League players
Challenger Pro League players
Lierse S.K. players
Cameroon international footballers
Cameroonian expatriate footballers
Expatriate footballers in France
Expatriate footballers in Portugal
Expatriate footballers in England
Expatriate footballers in Greece
Expatriate footballers in Belgium
Cameroonian expatriate sportspeople in France
Cameroonian expatriate sportspeople in Portugal
Cameroonian expatriate sportspeople in England
Cameroonian expatriate sportspeople in Belgium